Geoffrey Kiprotich (born 1978) is a Kenyan track and field and long-distance runner. He finished fourth in the 400 metres at the 2016 IAAF World U20 Championships at Zdzisław Krzyszkowiak Stadium in Poland. He also competed at the 2014 World Junior Championships in Athletics in the 200 metres and the 2017 IAAF World Relays in the 4 × 400 metres relay. Later, he was a winner in the Fargo Marathon, the Akron Marathon, the Des Moines Marathon, and the Glass City Marathon.

References

1978 births
Living people
Kenyan male marathon runners